(full title: : "Letter to M. Dacier concerning the alphabet of the phonetic hieroglyphs") is a letter sent in 1822 by the Egyptologist Jean-François Champollion to Bon-Joseph Dacier, secretary of the French Académie des Inscriptions et Belles-Lettres. It is the founding text upon which Ancient Egyptian hieroglyphs were first systematically deciphered by Champollion, largely on the basis of the multilingual Rosetta Stone.

History
On September 14, 1822, while visiting his brother Jacques-Joseph, a great supporter of his ideas, Champollion made a crucial breakthrough in understanding the phonetic nature of hieroglyphs and proclaimed, "Je tiens l'affaire!" ("I've got it!") and then fainted from his excitement.

On September 27, 1822, he exhibited at the Académie des Inscriptions et Belles-Lettres a draft containing eight pages of text to a packed room. The final version was published in late October 1822 by Firmin-Didot in a booklet of 44 pages with four illustrated plates.

Display at the Louvre
On the 150th anniversary of the Lettre in October 1972, the Rosetta Stone was displayed next to it at the Louvre in Paris.

French text of the Letter
"It is a complex system, writing figurative, symbolic, and phonetic all at once, in the same text, the same phrase, I would almost say in the same word."
Jean-François Champollion, Lettre à M. Dacier relative à l'alphabet des hiéroglyphes phonétiques (Paris, 1822) – at French Wikisource

See also
Decipherment of Egyptian hieroglyphs
Translation of the letter by Rhys Bryant

References

Egyptian hieroglyphs
Egyptology